Nobby is the diminutive form of the name Norbert. It is also a nickname most commonly used in English for those with the surname Clark or Clarke.

Origins as a nickname
A number of possible explanations exist for the use of Nobby as a nickname for people with the surname Clark. These include:

 Clerks in the City of London used to wear Nobby hats, a type of bowler hat. Alternative spellings include "Knobby" and "Clarke".
 16th century monks wrote letters for the illiterate. These monks were referred to as "Clerks". The outcome of so much writing causes calluses on the fingers "nobs" and therefore "Nobby Clerks" was born.
 In England the term "nob" is used to refer to a member of the aristocracy and by extension a posh person. Clerks were also required to maintain a high standard of dress, and were paid a clothing allowance.  The result was that they always appeared smart. A clerk would deal with the common people but would be better educated, better paid and in a position of relative power.  To the uneducated, clerks were posh and therefore considered to be "nobs".  Hence, nobby Clark. Both the Oxford English and the English Dialect Dictionaries list nobby as being of a rich man, a nob or toff, or “smart”, and gives it a wide distribution, so smart persons were "nobby".

Nobby Clark is also cockney rhyming slang for a shark.

People
 Nobby Clark (disambiguation)
 Gordon "Nobby" Clark (born 1950), former singer of the Scottish band Bay City Rollers
 Neil Clarke (Australian footballer) (1957–2003)
 William Clarke (cryptographer) (1883–1961), British intelligence officer and cryptographer of naval codes in both World Wars
 Nobby Hunt (1903–1983), English cricketer
 Nobby Lawton (1940–2006), English footballer
 George Nash (rower) (born 1989), English rower
 Brian Noble (rugby league) (born 1961), English rugby league coach and former player
 Nolberto Solano (born 1974), Peruvian retired footballer
 Nobby Stiles (1942–2020), English footballer
 Norbert Tiemann (1924–2012), American politician and 32nd Governor of Nebraska
 Nobby Wirkowski (1926–2014), American football player

Fictional characters
 Georg "Nobby" Hegel, a German philosopher in The_Philosophers' Football_Match
 Nobby Nobbs, a member of the Ankh-Morpork City Watch in the Discworld fantasy novel series
 The player character in the 1993 video game Nobby the Aardvark
 Nobby the Enchanted Bobby, title character of the comic strip of the same name in The Beano (1952–1954) – see List of Beano comic strips
 Nobby, title character of the strip of the same name in the comics Buzz and later The Topper
 Nobby, in the Enid Blyton book Five Go Off in a Caravan
 Nobby Butcher, the main character in the 2016 film Grimsby, played by Sacha Baron Cohen.
 Zenobia 'Nobby' Hopwood, a character in the P. G. Wodehouse book Joy in the Morning.
 Nobby Cranton, a gentleman thief in the Dorothy L. Sayers book The Nine Tailors.

Lists of people by nickname